The Men's 200m athletics events for the 2020 Summer Paralympics took place at the Tokyo National Stadium from August 31 to September 4, 2021. A total of 5 events were contested over this distance.

Schedule

Medal summary
The following is a summary of the medals awarded across all 200 metres events.

Results
The following were the results of the finals only of each of the Men's 200 metres events in each of the classifications. Further details of each event, including where appropriate heats and semi finals results, are available on that event's dedicated page.

T35

The final in this classification took place on 4 September, at 10:18:

T37

The final in this classification took place on 4 September, at 10:27:

T51

The final in this classification took place on 31 August 2021, at 10:18:

T61

The final in this classification took place on 3 September 2021, at 19:42:

T64

The final in this classification took place on 4 September 2021, at 20:15:

References

Athletics at the 2020 Summer Paralympics
2021 in men's athletics